The Danleers were an American doo-wop group formed in Brooklyn, New York in 1958.  The group's original and most famous lineup consisted of Jimmy Weston, Johnny Lee, Willie Ephraim, Nat McCune, and Roosevelt Mays. One of many streetcorner vocal groups in Brooklyn, they rose to prominence in 1958 on the strength of the single "One Summer Night", written by their manager, Danny Webb, who also named the group. The single was one of the biggest hits of that year and sold over one million copies. Further releases were not so successful and the group mostly dissolved by the mid-1960s. It continued to tour for several decades with Weston as the main original member.

Background
The Danleers formed in Brooklyn, New York in early 1958, joining the ranks of the many street-corner doo-wop groups existing at the time. Danny Webb became the group’s manager and principal songwriter, naming them after himself. The group recorded their debut single, "One Summer Night", for the AMP 3 label, owned by Bill Lasley, who signed the group in the spring of 1958. The song began gaining traction regionally and, unable to handle distribution, the label leased the single to Mercury Records. Mercury helped push the record to become one of that year’s biggest summer songs, selling over one million copies. "One Summer Night"  reached number four on the Billboard Black Singles chart, and number seven on the Best Selling Pop Singles in Stores chart in 1958.

The group joined Frankie Avalon, Bobby Darin, and others on a nationally touring road show in the late 1950s. Their efforts with subsequent singles were not successes. They released two more singles on Mercury before the label dropped them, and they dissolved as the decade closed. Weston and Webb were determined to have another hit single, and signed with Epic in 1960 with a new lineup. Their first release for Epic, "If You Don’t Care", did not attract attention, nor did any other releases from the group. The group continued to tour in support of their one hit for several decades, with various members. The original group reformed for one show at the Westbury Music Fair on Long Island in 1988. In 1996, The Best of the Danleers: The Mercury Years, was released; the compilation includes all of the group’s singles for Mercury, in addition to unreleased recordings.

Members
Information regarding members culled from American Singing Groups: A History from 1940s to Today by Jay Warner.
Jimmy Weston – lead vocals (1958–64; 1972–93) Died June, 1993
Johnny Lee – first tenor (1958–59; 1988) 
Willie Ephraim – second tenor (1958–59; 1988) Born January 7, 1939 Died October 15, 1998
Nat McCune – baritone (1958–59; 1972–93)
Roosevelt Mays – bass (1958–59; 1988) 
Louis Williams – first tenor (1960–64)
Doug Ebron – second tenor (1960–64; 1972) Died before 1988
Terry Wilson – baritone (1960–64)
Frankie Clemens – bass (1960–64)
Bill Carey – baritone (1972–93) Died September 12, 2016 
Robert Mirra - Lead vocals (2012-)

Discography

Compilation albums

Singles

References

External links
 The Danleers by Marv Goldberg
 The Danleers Biography at Doo Wop Nation
 The Danleers Discography at Soulful Kinda Music

American vocal groups
Doo-wop groups
Mercury Records artists
Smash Records artists
Epic Records artists
Musical groups established in 1958
Musical groups disestablished in 1964
Musical groups reestablished in 1972
Musical groups disestablished in 1993
1958 establishments in New York City
Musical groups from Brooklyn